Condamine is an electoral district of the Legislative Assembly in the Australian state of Queensland.

Condamine takes in areas to the north-west, west and south of Toowoomba. It includes a number of small towns, such as Oakey, Pittsworth, Cambooya and Clifton. The district is named for the Condamine River which runs through it. Created for the 2009 state election, it was mostly made up of territory previously belonging to the abolished districts of Cunningham and Darling Downs. It also drew a small number of voters previously belonging to the district of Toowoomba South. Originally proposed to be named Dalby by the Electoral Commission of Queensland, the name Condamine was adopted instead upon further review.

There was also an earlier district known as Condamine that existed from 1950 to 1992. It was based in the same region.

History
The electorate's re-introduction at the 2009 state election pitted two sitting members against each other. MPs Ray Hopper and Stuart Copeland both had their districts, Darling Downs and Cunningham respectively, abolished and largely absorbed into Condamine. Both had belonged to the Liberal National Party (LNP).  Under the LNP constitution, if a seat is abolished, the sitting member who represents a majority of voters in a successor seat is automatically preselected as LNP candidate. In this case, Hopper automatically gained LNP preselection, as most of Condamine's voters came from Darling Downs.  Copeland ran as an independent, only to be defeated by Hopper at the election.

Members for Condamine

Election results

References

External links
 Electorate profile (Antony Green, ABC)

Condamine
Darling Downs
Toowoomba
Constituencies established in 1950
Constituencies established in 2009
Constituencies disestablished in 1992
1950 establishments in Australia
2009 establishments in Australia
1992 disestablishments in Australia